Niccolò Laniere, known by the French name Nicholas Lanière in England (1568–1646) was an Italian painter of the Baroque period, while born in Italy, was active in the England of Charles I. He was involved in making art purchases for the Royal collection. He was also an engraver and is credited in contemporary records as scene-painter and musician. He died in London.

Note: Nicholas Lanier (1588–1666) was a contemporary English court composer and musician.

References

1568 births
1646 deaths
16th-century Italian painters
Italian male painters
17th-century Italian painters
16th-century English painters
English male painters
17th-century English painters
Italian Baroque painters